Ross–Ade Stadium is a stadium in West Lafayette, Indiana, on the campus of Purdue University. It is the home field of Purdue Boilermakers football. The stadium was dedicated on November 22, 1924, and named in honor of Purdue alumni George Ade and David E. Ross. On December 6, 2019, it was announced that the new name for the playing surface is Rohrman Field at Ross–Ade Stadium.

History

The stadium was built in 1924 to replace Stuart Field, which had been hosting Purdue football since 1892. It is named in honor of Purdue alumni David E. Ross and George Ade, the principal benefactors. In 1922 Ade and Ross bought  of land for the site of the new stadium. They also provided additional financial support for construction of the facility. Ross–Ade Stadium opened on November 22, 1924, with a seating capacity of 13,500—roughly corresponding to the lower portion of the current facility's west grandstand---and standing room for an additional 5,000 people. A series of additions and renovations pushed the seating capacity to almost 68,000 (70,000 with standing room). In 2001, Purdue University began a $70 million renovation, including widening both aisles and seats, which led to a reduced seating capacity of 62,500.

The first game and first win came in the 1924 Homecoming dismantling of the Indiana Hoosiers.

The largest crowd ever to see a game in Ross-Ade is 71,629 against Indiana on November 22, 1980.

In summer 2017, Ross–Ade Stadium installed permanent stadium lights.

In March 2019 it was announced that a memorial for Superfan Tyler Trent, who died on January 1, 2019, at the age of 20 from osteosarcoma, a type of bone cancer, would be placed at Student Section Gate entrance in his honor.

On December 6, 2019, it was announced that due to a $15 million gift, the new name of the facility is Rohrman Field at Ross–Ade Stadium.

On September 4, 2021, the Boilermakers opened their 97th season in the 500th game at Ross-Ade with a 30-21 win over Oregon State.

Renovations
In the spring of 2000, it was announced that Ross–Ade would undergo a three-phase renovation, beginning the following year.  A breakdown of each phase is as follows:

Phase I (2001–2003)
Replace the 50-year-old Woodworth Memorial Press Box, located on the west side of the stadium, with a four-story pavilion, housing the Shively Media Center, 34 luxury suites, and a 200-seat indoor club level
Add outdoor club seats with exclusive access to the pavilion's suites
Expand the main concourse
Add new bathrooms and concession stands
Add a new “grand staircase” to the south end of the stadium
Replace all concrete and benches.

Phase II (TBA)
Add an upper deck to the east side of stadium

Phase III (TBA)
Add upper deck to north bend of stadium, connecting east upper deck and Pavilion

While originally thought that both Phases II and III would be solely dependent upon future ticket sales, former Athletic Director Morgan Burke indicated in early 2009 that the project may move forward in the near future, regardless of season ticket sales.

Additional proposals
There has been a desire expressed by both former head coach Joe Tiller and Burke to remove seating in the south end zone to use the land for alternative purposes.  Tiller and subsequently the school's architectural department, has proposed using the land for football administrative offices and locker rooms. Burke has proposed shaping the land into a landscaped hill, providing lush views of campus scenery. Ultimately, these bleachers were removed in the summer of 2014, with restorative work performed on the concrete foundation on which the bleachers sat.

Other renovations
In 2004, a limestone and brick tunnel was dedicated to the memory of the 17 football players, coaches, alumni, and fans who died in the 1903 Purdue Wreck in Indianapolis.
In June 2006, the Kentucky bluegrass was replaced by Bermuda grass.  The Prescription Athletic Turf system is still in use.
In July 2006, Action Sports Media announced a ten-year partnership with Purdue, helping finance the installation of a new state-of-the-art  Daktronics video board, priced at $1.7 million, and sideline advertising panel.  The new technology was installed in time for the start of the 2007 season.
In June 2014, the south end-zone bleachers, which seated 6,100 spectators, were removed to avoid necessary safety upgrades and in preparation for proposed renovations. The area was converted to a patio area for fans to enjoy a more party like atmosphere. There were several tables set up with a large concessions tent anchor the middle of the area. This is the first time a regular game attendee could purchase alcohol.

Night games at Ross-Ade Stadium
Temporary lights (1–7)
October 18, 1986: Ohio State L 11–39
September 10, 1994: Toledo W 51–17 
September 21, 1996: West Virginia L 6–20
October 1, 2005: Notre Dame L 28–49 
October 6, 2007: Ohio State  L 7–23 
September 26, 2009: Notre Dame L 21–24  
October 1, 2011: Notre Dame L 10–38  
September 14, 2013: (21) Notre Dame  L 24–31  

Under permanent lights (4–5)
September 8, 2017: Ohio W 44-21
October 28, 2017: Nebraska L 24-25
August 30, 2018: Northwestern L 27-31
September 15, 2018: Missouri L 37-40
October 20, 2018: (2) Ohio State W 49-20
September 14, 2019: TCU L 13-34
September 4, 2021: Oregon State W 30-21
September 1, 2022: Penn State L 31-35
October 15, 2022 Nebraska W 43-37

See also

 List of NCAA Division I FBS football stadiums

References

External links

 
 Purdue e-archives 1925 Debris
 Images of 1949 stadium expansion

College football venues
Purdue Boilermakers football
American football venues in Indiana
Purdue University campus
1924 establishments in Indiana
Sports venues completed in 1924